The Aristocats is a 1970 American animated romantic musical comedy film produced by Walt Disney Productions and directed by Wolfgang Reitherman. It is the final Disney animated film to be involved with Walt Disney Productions's co-founder Roy O. Disney before his death on December 20, 1971. The 20th Disney animated feature film, the film is based on a story by Tom McGowan and Tom Rowe, and revolves around a family of aristocratic cats, and how an alley cat acquaintance helps them after a butler has kidnapped them to gain his mistress's fortune which was intended to go to them. The film features the voices of Phil Harris, Eva Gabor, Hermione Baddeley, Dean Clark, Sterling Holloway, Scatman Crothers, and Roddy Maude-Roxby.

In 1962, The Aristocats project began as an original script for a two-part live-action episode for Walt Disney's Wonderful World of Color, developed by writers Tom McGowan and Tom Rowe and producer Harry Tytle. Following two years of re-writes, Walt Disney suggested the project would be more suitable for an animated film, and placed the project in turnaround as The Jungle Book (1967) advanced into production. When The Jungle Book was nearly complete, Disney appointed Ken Anderson to develop preliminary work on The Aristocats, making it the last film project to be approved by Disney personally before his death in December 1966. Longtime Disney collaborators Robert and Richard Sherman composed multiple songs for the film, though only two made it in the finished product.

The Aristocats was released on December 24, 1970, to generally positive reviews from film critics. It was also a commercial success. A live-action remake is currently in development.

Plot

In 1910, mother cat Duchess and her three kittens (Berlioz, Marie, and Toulouse) live in Paris with retired opera diva Madame Adelaide Bonfamille, and her English butler, Edgar. The cats are pampered pets that live a luxurious lifestyle, and are very cultured in art and music like their owner.

One day, while preparing her will with elderly lawyer Georges Hautecourt, Madame declares that her vast fortune will be first left to her cats, then revert to Edgar once they all pass away. Edgar overhears this through a speaking tube and, after erroneously calculating that he will die before he can inherit, plots to eliminate the cats. He sedates them by putting sleeping pills in a dish of cream, then drives them on his motorcycle out to the countryside in a basket. There, he is ambushed by two hounds named Napoleon and Lafayette, losing his hat, sidecar, umbrella, shoes, and the basket before escaping. The cats are left stranded in the countryside, while Madame Adelaide, Roquefort the mouse, and Frou-Frou the horse discover their absence.

In the morning, Duchess meets an alley cat named Thomas O'Malley, who offers to guide her and the kittens to Paris. The group briefly hitchhikes in a milk truck before being chased out by the driver. Later, while crossing a railroad trestle, the cats narrowly avoid an oncoming train, and Marie falls into a river. O'Malley immediately dives in and rescues her, and is himself rescued by Amelia and Abigail Gabble, two British geese on holiday. The geese lead the cats to the outskirts of Paris, then depart to deal with their inebriated Uncle Waldo. Meanwhile, Edgar returns to the countryside to retrieve his possessions—the only evidence that can incriminate him—from Napoleon and Lafayette and, after some difficulty, ultimately succeeds.

Traveling across the rooftops of the city, the cats meet up with O'Malley's friend Scat Cat and his musicians, who perform the song "Ev'rybody Wants to Be a Cat". After the band has departed, O'Malley and Duchess converse on a nearby rooftop while the kittens listen at a windowsill. Duchess' loyalty to Madame prompts her to decline O'Malley's marriage proposal. The next day, Duchess and the kittens return to Madame's mansion. Edgar finds them before Madame does, and places them in a sack, deciding to ship them to Timbuktu.
 
Roquefort catches up with O'Malley at Duchess’ instruction, and O'Malley returns to the mansion, sending Roquefort to find Scat Cat and his gang. Though he struggles to explain the situation to the alley cats, Roquefort successfully brings them to O'Malley's aid. O'Malley, the alley cats, and Frou-Frou fight Edgar, while Roquefort frees Duchess and the kittens. At the end of the fight, Edgar is locked in his own packing-case and sent to Timbuktu himself, never to be seen again.

The Aristocats return to Madame Adelaide, who, ignorant of the real reason for Edgar's departure, rewrites her will to exclude him. After adopting O'Malley into the family, Madame establishes a charity foundation, housing Paris' stray cats in the mansion. Scat Cat and his gang are the first to move in, and reprise their song so loudly that the two hound dogs can hear it out in the countryside.

Voice cast
 Phil Harris as J. Thomas O'Malley (full name: Abraham de Lacy Giuseppe Casey Thomas O'Malley) – a feral cat who befriends Duchess and her kittens, becoming a father figure and a step-father to the kittens and falling in love with Duchess. For cultural reasons, the Italian dubbing of the film changes him to “Romeo, er mejo der Colosseo” ("The best [cat] of the Colosseum" in Romanesco dialect), an Italian cat from Rome speaking with a strong Roman accent; the reason for this change is that alley cats were well-known for frequenting the Colosseum at the time.
 Eva Gabor as Duchess – Madame Adelaide's refined and elegant Turkish Angora cat and mother of the three kittens, who believes she is forced to choose between loyalty to Madame and her own attachment to Thomas O'Malley at the end of the film. Robie Lester provided the singing voice for Duchess.
 Gary Dubin as Toulouse – the oldest kitten, who idolizes all alley cats, especially O’Malley. He is also a talented painter and is loosely based on French painter Henri de Toulouse-Lautrec.
 Liz English as Marie – the middle kitten and the only girl. She is often imperious, sassy or snobbish towards her brothers but is her mother's special companion, and like her, she is an accomplished singer. She is named after the queen of France Marie Antoinette.
 Dean Clark as Berlioz – the youngest kitten. He is somewhat timid and shy and is a talented pianist. He is named after the French composer Hector Berlioz. 
 Sterling Holloway as Roquefort – a house mouse and a friend of the cats who assists in the expulsion of Edgar.

 Scatman Crothers as Scat Cat – O’Malley's best friend and leader of a gang of jazz-playing alley cats. Scat Cat plays the trumpet.
 Paul Winchell as Shun Gon – a Chinese cat in Scat Cat's gang. He plays both the piano and drums made from pots.
 Lord Tim Hudson as Hit Cat – an English cat in Scat Cat's gang. He plays acoustic guitar.
 Vito Scotti as Peppo – an Italian cat in Scat Cat's gang. He plays the concertina.
 Thurl Ravenscroft as Billy Boss – a Russian cat in Scat Cat's gang. He plays the double bass.
 Nancy Kulp as Frou-Frou – Madame Adelaide’s Palomino carriage horse and Roquefort's companion, who subdues Edgar. Ruth Buzzi provided her singing voice.
 Pat Buttram as Napoleon – a bloodhound who attacks Edgar when he intrudes on the farm where he lives. Whenever his cohort Lafayette makes a suggestion, Napoleon insists that he is in charge, then adopts Lafayette's suggestion as his own.
 George Lindsey as Lafayette – a Basset Hound and Napoleon's companion. He sometimes proves smarter than Napoleon but is also more timid.
 Hermione Baddeley as Madame Adelaide Bonfamille – a wealthy former opera singer and the owner of Duchess and her kittens.
 Charles Lane as Georges Hautecourt – Madame Adelaide’s eccentric lawyer, who is also her oldest friend. He is extremely lively, despite his advanced age.
 Roddy Maude-Roxby as Edgar Balthazar – Madame Adelaide's dim-witted butler, who tries to get rid of her cats in order to inherit her fortune.
 Monica Evans as Abigail Gabble – Amelia's twin sister, a goose who befriends the cats.
 Carole Shelley as Amelia Gabble – Abigail's twin sister, a goose who befriends the cats.
 Bill Thompson as Uncle Waldo – the drunken gander uncle of Abigail and Amelia. This was Thompson's final film role.
 Peter Renaday as French Milkman/Le Petit Cafe Cook/Truck Movers (uncredited)

Production

Story development
On December 9, 1961, Walt Disney suggested that Harry Tytle and Tom McGowan find some animal stories to adapt as a two-part live-action episode for the Wonderful World of Color television program. By New Year's 1962, McGowan had found several stories including a children's book about a mother cat and her kittens set in New York City. However, Tytle felt that the London setting had added a significant element to One Hundred and One Dalmatians (1961) and suggested setting the story of the cats in Paris. Following a rough storyline, the story became about two servants—a butler and a maid—who were in line to inherit a fortune of an eccentric mistress after the pet cats died and focused on their feeble and foolish attempts to eliminate the felines. Boris Karloff and Françoise Rosay were in mind to portray the butler and the distressed Madame. A subplot centered around a mother cat hiding her kittens to keep them out of danger in a variety of different homes and locales around Paris. During the filming of Escapade in Florence (1962), McGowan brought Tytle the story that had been written by Tom Rowe, an American writer who was living in Paris. 

By August 1962, they sent the completed story treatment to Burbank, where it was returned as "rejected" by the Disney studios. McGowan, upset at the rejection, suggested selling the treatment elsewhere, but later learned Disney was staying at the Connaught in London. McGowan then slipped the treatment into an envelope for Disney to read at the hotel desk. Disney contacted McGowan, stating he had liked the treatment and would meet with Tytle in Lisbon, Portugal. On August 29, during their flight back to London, Disney told Tytle to purchase the story for a live-action theatrical film, with McGowan as director. Disney also recommended further story revisions, one of which was eliminating one of the kitten characters. 

The script revisions were later made in January and February 1963. In June 1963, Rowe had written a letter to Disney addressing his displeasure of the script revisions, in which Tytle responded to Rowe that the changes Disney approved of would be kept. However, the project was temporarily shelved, and in August 1963, Tytle suggested that The Aristocats should be reworked into an animated feature, to which Disney agreed. At Disney's recommendation, Tytle presented the project to Wolfgang Reitherman, who was directing The Jungle Book (1967), who agreed it would work as an animated film. For that reason, Disney temporarily shelved the project as the animation department was occupied with The Jungle Book (1967). In April 1964, story artist Otto Englander was assigned to work on the project. In November 1964, during a story meeting, Disney felt the cats should talk amongst themselves but never in front of the humans, in a similar approach as in One Hundred and One Dalmatians (1961). Because of the production delays, studio producer Bill Anderson advised Tytle to centralize his efforts on live action projects, and he was subsequently replaced by Winston Hibler.

In 1966, Disney assigned Ken Anderson to determine whether The Aristocats would be suitable for an animated feature. With occasional guidance from Reitherman, Anderson worked from scratch and simplified the two stories into a story that focused more on the cats. Disney saw the preliminary sketches and approved the project shortly before his death. After The Jungle Book (1967) was completed, the animation department began work on The Aristocats. Reitherman assumed the producing duties, and later tossed out the more emotional story of Duchess's obsession to find human adopters befitting of her kittens' talents. Instead, the film would be retooled as an adventure comedy in the vein of One Hundred and One Dalmatians (1961). Furthermore, the character Elvira, the maid, who was intended to be voiced by Elsa Lanchester, was removed from the story placing Edgar as the central villain in order to better simplify the storyline.

Casting
As with The Jungle Book (1967), the characters were patterned on the personalities of the voice actors. In 1966, Disney contacted Phil Harris to improvise the script, and shortly after, he was cast to voice Thomas O'Malley. To differentiate the character from Baloo, Reitherman noted O'Malley was "more based on Clark Gable than Wallace Beery, who was partly the model for Baloo." Furthermore, Reitherman cast Eva Gabor as Duchess, remarking she had "the freshest femme voice we've ever had", and Sterling Holloway as Roquefort. Louis Armstrong was initially reported to voice Scat Cat, but he had to back out of the project due to illness. Out of desperation, Scatman Crothers was hired to voice the character under the direction to imitate Armstrong. Pat Buttram and George Lindsey were cast as the farm dogs, which proved to be popular with the filmmakers that another scene was included to have the dogs when Edgar returns to the farm to retrieve his displaced hat and umbrella.

Animation
Ken Anderson spent eighteen months developing the design of the characters. Five of Disney's legendary "Nine Old Men" worked on it, including the Disney crew that had been working 25 years on average. Originally, O'Malley was going to be drawn with stripes to have him resemble a tabby cat, but this was dropped after Reitherman remembered the difficulty in animating Shere Khan in The Jungle Book.

Music
The Aristocats was the last Disney animated feature Robert and Richard Sherman worked on as staff songwriters, growing frustrated by the studio's management following Disney's death. While employed, the Sherman Brothers completed their work on the film, but they would not return back to Disney until they were asked to compose songs for The Tigger Movie (2000).

The Sherman Brothers composed multiple songs, but only the title song and "Scales and Arpeggios" were included in the film. Desiring to capture the essence of France, the Sherman Brothers composed the song "The Aristocats". Disney film producer Bill Anderson would ask Maurice Chevalier to participate in the film. Following the suggestion, Richard Sherman imitated Chevalier's voice as he performed a demo for the song. Chevalier received the demo and was brought out of retirement to sing the song. Deleted songs that were intended for the film included "Pourquoi?" sung by Hermione Baddeley as Madame Bonfamille, its reprise, and "She Never Felt Alone" sung by Robie Lester as Duchess. For the show-stopping number, the Sherman Brothers composed "Le Jazz Hot", but "Ev'rybody Wants to Be a Cat", composed by Floyd Huddleston and Al Rinker, was used instead. Lastly, a villainous song was envisioned to be sung by Edgar and his assistant Elvira as a romantic duet, but the song was dropped when Elvira was removed from the story.

Another deleted song was for Thomas O'Malley titled "My Way's The Highway", but the filmmakers had Terry Gilkyson compose the eponymous song "Thomas O'Malley Cat". Gilkyson explained, "It was the same song, but they orchestrated it twice. They used the simpler one, because they may have thought the other too elaborate or too hot. It was a jazz version with a full orchestra."

The instrumental music was composed by George Bruns, who drew from his background with jazz bands in the 1940s and decided to feature the accordion-like musette for French flavor.

On Classic Disney: 60 Years of Musical Magic, this includes "Thomas O'Malley Cat" on the purple disc and "Ev'rybody Wants to Be a Cat" on the orange disc. On Disney's Greatest Hits, this includes "Ev'rybody Wants to Be a Cat" on the red disc.

On August 21, 2015, in honor of the film's 45th anniversary, a new soundtrack was released as part of Walt Disney Records: The Legacy Collection. The release includes the songs and score as used in the film, along with The Lost Chords of the Aristocats (featuring songs written for the film but not used), and previously released album versions of the songs as bonus tracks.

Songs
Original songs performed in the film include:

Release
The Aristocats was originally released to theaters on December 24, 1970. The film was released as a double feature with Niok, the Orphan Elephant (1957). It was re-released in theaters in 1980 and 1987.

Home media
It was released on VHS in Europe on January 1, 1990, and in the UK in 1995. It was first released on VHS in North America on April 24, 1996, as part of the Masterpiece Collection.
 
In January 2000, Walt Disney Home Video launched the Gold Classic Collection, and The Aristocats was released on VHS and DVD on April 4, 2000. The DVD contained the film in its 1.33:1 aspect ratio enhanced with Dolby 2.0 surround sound. The Gold Collection release was quietly discontinued in 2006. A new single-disc Special Edition DVD (previously announced as a 2-Disc set) was released on February 5, 2008.

Disney released the film on Blu-ray for the first time on August 21, 2012. The 2-disc Special Edition Blu-ray/DVD combo (both in Blu-ray and DVD packaging) featured a new digital transfer and new bonus material. A single disc DVD edition was also released on the same day.

Reception

Box office
By January 1972, The Aristocats had earned $10.1 million in box office rentals from the United States and Canada. Overseas, the film became the most popular "general release" movie at the British box office in 1971. The film was the most popular film in France in 1971 and had total admissions of 12.7 million. It is also ranked as the eighteenth highest-grossing of all time in France. The film is the most popular film released in Germany in 1971 with admissions of 11.3 million being the country's eleventh highest-grossing film. By the end of its initial theatrical run, the film had earned domestic rentals of $11 million and $17 million in foreign countries, for a worldwide rental of $28 million.

The film was re-released to theaters in the United States on December 19, 1980, where it grossed an additional $18 million and again on April 10, 1987, where it grossed $17 million. The film grossed $32 million worldwide from an international re-release in 1994, including $11 million in France. The Aristocats has had a lifetime gross of $55.7 million in the United States and Canada, and its total lifetime worldwide box office gross is $191 million.

Critical reaction
Howard Thompson of The New York Times praised the film as "grand fun all the way, nicely flavored with tunes, and topped with one of the funniest jam sessions ever by a bunch of scraggly Bohemians headed by one Scat Cat." Roger Ebert, writing for the Chicago Sun-Times, awarded the film three stars out of four, summarizing The Aristocats as "light and pleasant and funny, the characterization is strong, and the voices of Phil Harris (O'Malley the Alley Cat) and Eva Gabor (Duchess, the mother cat) are charming in their absolute rightness." Charles Champlin of the Los Angeles Times wrote that the film "has a gentle good-natured charm which will delight the small-fry and their elders alike." He praised the animation, but remarked that the film "lacks a certain kind of vigor, boldness and dash, a kind of a hard-focused emphasis which you would say was a Disney trademark." Arthur D. Murphy of Variety praised the film writing the film is "[h]elped immeasurably by the voices of Phil Harris, Eva Gabor, Sterling Holloway, Scatman Crothers and others, plus some outstanding animation, songs, sentiment, some excellent dialog and even a touch of psychedelia." Stefan Kanfer, reviewing for Time magazine, noted that "[t]he melodies in Disney's earlier efforts have been richer. But for integration of music, comedy and plot, The Aristocats has no rivals."

Gene Siskel of the Chicago Tribune felt the film's "artwork and story do not compare to the truly great Disney films Snow White, Pinocchio, Bambi and Dumbo but there is enough juvenile humor to keep the children in their seats for the 78 minutes." For its 1987 re-release, animation historian Charles Solomon expressed criticism for its episodic plot, anachronisms, and borrowed plot elements from earlier Disney animated features, but nevertheless wrote "[b]ut even at their least original, the Disney artists provide better animation--and more entertainment--than the recent animated features hawking The Care Bears, Rainbow Brite and Transformers." Writing in his book The Disney Films, Disney historian and film critic Leonard Maltin wrote that "[t]he worst that one could say of The AristoCats is that it is unmemorable. It's smoothly executed, of course, and enjoyable, but neither its superficial story nor its characters have any resonance." Additionally, in his book Of Mice and Magic, Maltin criticized the film for re-using Phil Harris to replicate The Jungle Books Baloo, dismissing the character Thomas O'Malley as "essentially the same character, dictated by the same voice personality."

The review aggregator website Rotten Tomatoes reported that the film received a 63% approval rating, with an average rating of 5.80/10 based on 32 reviews. Its consensus states: "Though The Aristocats is a mostly middling effort for Disney, it is redeemed by terrific work from its voice cast and some jazzy tunes."

Accolades
The film is recognized by American Film Institute in these lists:
 2008: AFI's 10 Top 10:
 Nominated Animation Film

Other media

Cancelled sequel
In 2005, Disneytoon Studios originally planned to make a follow-up to the film, along with sequels to Chicken Little (2005) and Meet the Robinsons (2007). Originally intended to be a 2D animated feature, Disney executives decided to produce the film in computer animation in order to garner more interest. Additionally, the story was meant to center around Marie, Duchess's daughter, who becomes smitten by another kitten aboard a luxury cruise ship. However, she and her family must soon take on a jewel thief on the open seas. The project was cancelled when John Lasseter was named Disney's new chief creative officer, in which he called off all future sequels Disneytoon had planned and instead make original productions or spin-offs.

Cancelled TV series
In 2000, a television series, titled The Aristocats: The Animated Series, was commissioned by Disney Television Animation. The series would follow Marie, Toulouse, and Berlioz (now teenagers and also anthropomorphic), along with a new character named Delancey. The series was scheduled to be released sometime in 2002, but production was put on hold in 2001. It would restart production in 2003, with a release scheduled for late 2006 or 2007, only for it to be scrapped after Disney's acquisition of Pixar.

Live-action adaptation
In January 2022, it was announced that a live-action remake is in development with Will Gluck producing under his Olive Bridge Entertainment banner and Keith Bunin writing the script with Gluck.

See also
 List of highest-grossing animated films
 List of highest-grossing films in France
 List of American films of 1970
 List of animated feature films of 1970
 List of Walt Disney Pictures films
 List of Disney theatrical animated features

References

Bibliography

External links

 
 
 
 
 
 The Aristocats at Don Markstein's Toonopedia. Archived from the original on April 4, 2012.

1970 animated films
1970 romantic comedy films
1970 films
1970s American animated films
1970s children's animated films
1970s English-language films
1970s musical comedy films
American children's animated comedy films
American children's animated adventure films
American musical comedy films
American romantic comedy films
American romantic musical films
Animated films about cats
Animated films set in France
Animated films set in Paris
Domestic workers in films
Films about animals
Films about families
Films about inheritances
Films directed by Wolfgang Reitherman
Films scored by George Bruns
Films set in 1910
Films set in the 1910s
Walt Disney Animation Studios films
Walt Disney Pictures animated films
Films produced by Winston Hibler